Isaac Kristofer Brock (born July 9, 1975) is an American musician who is the lead singer, songwriter, guitarist and banjoist for the indie rock band Modest Mouse, as well as his side project band, Ugly Casanova. As a songwriter, he is noted for his wordplay and frequent use of metaphors, philosophical lyrics, themes of authentic rural lifestyles, and phrases and sayings commonly used in the early to mid-20th century and in blue collar environments. Following the death of Jeremiah Green in 2022, Brock remains the sole founding member of Modest Mouse and the only member to appear on all studio albums due to Green being absent from 2003-2004 and Eric Judy departing the band in 2011.

Early life
Brock was born in Helena, Montana. During his childhood, he lived with his mother and sister in Montana and Oregon in hippie communes and churches before moving to Issaquah, Washington when he was 11 years old. Brock was home-schooled in his early education. When his mother's house flooded three times, she was forced to move into her future husband's trailer. Brock asked to stay behind in his own room until the new home was completed. He lived in the flooded home until the house was sold. After a short period of living in a friend's basement, he moved into the "Shed" built on the land next to his mother and stepfather's trailer.

As a young boy he was raised in a Christian religious sect called the Grace Gospel Church. He told an interviewer from The Guardian that he was asked to speak in tongues when he was six: "I didn't feel the spirit of the fucking Lord rushing through me," he says. "I definitely felt awkward. I thought. 'What's the best way to make this stop?' So I ripped off some words from Mary Poppins and said them fast, and the deacons are going, 'Yeah, all right!'"

In 1992, when he was sixteen, Brock moved to Washington, D.C. for the summer where he met his girlfriend.  Brock traveled back and forth from the East Coast to Issaquah in Washington State where he took a community-college course to get his high school diploma before moving back to D.C., to New York's East Village, and then the Seattle area.  It was there that he, Eric Judy (bass) and Jeremiah Green (drums) first started practicing music together in the Shed.

Personal life

Although many of his songs use religious themes, Brock describes himself as "not really religious at all", adding "I'm 100 percent on the whole Christianity thing being a crock of shit, pretty much." He claims to "toy around with the whole Biblical thing," because it "just has amazing characters" and also identifies himself as "pretty much" an atheist.

He has talked about the DUIs he has gotten and cutting himself onstage with a pocket knife. His songs have also addressed his substance abuse, as in "The Good Times Are Killing Me". Brock admits to past drug use, and now says that drugs are "just something I kind of have to fight... I just try and make sure that it's not around, or I'm not around it." In a 2003 interview with Salut Les Copains Magazine, Brock explained how the decision to quit drugs was influenced by his experiences. "...I was laying down in this aisle, at Powell's Books, reading an atlas when this meth-head tripped over me." Isaac said, "He called me a faggot and mumbled as he wandered off. I saw a reflection of myself and didn't want to be seen like that." 

In 2004 his adopted brother Ansel Vizcaya was killed in an avalanche climbing Mount Rainier.

Brock is a former A&R person for the record label Sub Pop; his most notable accomplishment with them was signing Wolf Parade in 2004.

Brock resides in Portland, Oregon in a house with many taxidermied animals. A portrait of Brock wearing lederhosen and standing in front of a giant boar hung for many years in the office of Portland mayor Sam Adams. He made a cameo appearance in season two of the sketch comedy show Portlandia.  His character was shown donating records to a pre-school library.

After having signed Lisa Molinaro to his Glacial Pace label in 2010, with her band Talkdemonic, the pair soon entered into a relationship. Molinaro joined Modest Mouse as a multi-instrumentalist and vocalist in 2011. They broke up in 2017.

Brock has three children. His first was born February 2, 2002. According to High Times magazine published November 2018, he also has a daughter, born some time in 2018. In another interview with a radio station 102.1 “The Edge”, it was revealed Brock had another daughter born sometime in 2020 or 2021.

Equipment
Brock's main guitars are custom made by Wicks Guitars. Prior to his customs, Brock mainly used a Westone Corsair XA1420. He is also known to use various other guitars made by companies such as Peavey,  Fender, and Gibson. His amps are custom made by Soursound, based on a Fender SuperSix, but are highly modified.

Glacial Pace
In October 2005, Brock started his own record label called Glacial Pace. The label used to be a subsidiary of Epic Records, but is now independent. Its first signee was Minnesota songwriter Mason Jennings, followed by Love As Laughter, Marcellus Hall, Mimicking Birds, Morning Teleportation, Talkdemonic, Survival Knife, Nocturnal Habits, and Mattress.

References

External links

 Official Modest Mouse Website
 Glacial Pace Recordings
 Spin.com "Video Vault: Modest Mouse's Isaac Brock"

1975 births
Living people
A&R people
American banjoists
American rock guitarists
Alternative rock guitarists
American rock singers
Sub Pop artists
Epic Records artists
K Records artists
People from Issaquah, Washington
Musicians from Portland, Oregon
Songwriters from Washington (state)
20th-century American singers
American male guitarists
American indie rock musicians
Alternative rock singers
20th-century American guitarists
21st-century American guitarists
Songwriters from Oregon
Singers from Oregon
Singers from Washington (state)
Guitarists from Washington (state)
Guitarists from Oregon
Modest Mouse members
Ugly Casanova members
20th-century American male singers
21st-century American male singers
21st-century American singers
American male songwriters